The 1923–24 NCAA men's basketball season began in December 1923, progressed through the regular season and conference tournaments, and concluded in March 1924.

Rule changes
A new rule required the player who was fouled to shoot his own free throws. Previously, a team could pick any player it wanted to shoot its free throws, and usually picked its best free-throw shooter to shoot all of them. The new rule thus brought to an end the practice of a team having a designated free-throw shooter.

Season headlines 

 North Carolina went undefeated, going 26-0, under coach Norman Shepard
 Butler won the annual Amateur Athletic Union basketball tournament — which included both collegiate and amateur non-collegiate teams — becoming the third of only four college teams to do so and the first to win the tournament since 1920.
 In February 1943, the Helms Athletic Foundation retroactively selected North Carolina as its national champion for the 1923–24 season.
 In 1995, the Premo-Porretta Power Poll retroactively selected North Carolina as its national champion for the 1923–24 season.

Conference membership changes

Regular season

Conference winners and tournaments

Statistical leaders

Awards

Helms College Basketball All-Americans 

The practice of selecting a Consensus All-American Team did not begin until the 1928–29 season. The Helms Athletic Foundation later retroactively selected a list of All-Americans for the 1923–24 season.

Major player of the year awards 

 Helms Player of the Year: Charlie T. Black, Kansas (retroactive selection in 1944)

Coaching changes 

A number of teams changed coaches during the season and after it ended.

References